NPI may refer to:

Institutes
Non-profit institution
Nationaal Pop Instituut: the Dutch Rock & Pop Institute
National Policy Institute, an American white supremacist think tank 
New Policy Institute, a British think tank focusing on poverty
Nordic Patent Institute, a patent search organisation for Nordic countries
Northwest Progressive Institute, a liberal American think tank concerned with social policy
Norwegian Polar Institute, performs environmental research in the polar regions

Other uses
Narcissistic Personality Inventory, a standard personality test for evaluating self-centredness 
National pollutant inventory
National Provider Identifier
Negative polarity item, grammatical form used during negation
New Politics Initiative
New product introduction
Nickel pig iron
Non-pharmaceutical intervention, health measures that are not centred on drug treatments
Non-pharmaceutical intervention (epidemiology), measures such as social distancing, face masks etc. to prevent COVID-19 etc.
Nonpublic personal information (Gramm–Leach–Bliley Act)
No pun intended
Nottingham Prognostic Index
NP-intermediate, a complexity class in computational complexity theory
Numbering plan indicator

See also

 NPI-1
 
 NP (disambiguation)
 NPL (disambiguation)
 NPIS (disambiguation)
 INP (disambiguation)
 IPN (disambiguation)
 PNI (disambiguation)
 pin (disambiguation)
 nip (disambiguation)